Mount Crosson is a  mountain in the Alaska Range, in Denali National Park and Preserve. Mount Crosson lies to the northeast of Mount Foraker, overlooking Kahiltna Glacier. The mountain was named in 1949 by mountaineer Bradford Washburn for bush pilot Joseph Crosson.

See also
Mountain peaks of Alaska
Marvel Crosson

References

Alaska Range
Mountains of Denali Borough, Alaska
Mountains of Alaska
Mountains of Denali National Park and Preserve